Racing de Sama, also known as Club Langreano, was a Spanish football club based in the parish of Sama , Langreo, Asturias. Founded in 1915, it held home matches at Torre de los Reyes, with a 1,500 capacity.

History
Racing de Sama was founded in 1915. In 1939, due to a temporary law forbidding the use of foreign words in football club names, changed its name to Club Langreano de Sama. This denomination was used until 1961, when the club merged with CP La Felguera for creating UP Langreo.

The club was refounded in 2006, but it only played three seasons before a new dissolution in 2009.

Seasons

18 seasons in Tercera División

Team refounded

References

Defunct football clubs in Asturias
UP Langreo
Association football clubs established in 1906
Association football clubs disestablished in 1961
1906 establishments in Spain
1961 disestablishments in Spain